William John Lanting (March 18, 1918 - April 22, 1998) was an American politician who was a member of the Idaho House of Representatives between 1959 and 1975. He rose to the rank of Majority Leader in 1963 and speaker in May 1967.

Early life
Lanting was born on March 18, 1918, in Twin Falls, Idaho. His parents were Dutch immigrants. He briefly lived in Manhattan, Montana, before moving to Rogerson, Idaho in 1923. He attended grade school in Rogerson and went to high school in Hollister, Idaho, graduating in 1935. On November 20, 1940, he married his wife Marguerite, and they had 4 children.

Idaho House of Representatives
In 1958, Lanting was elected to the Idaho House of Representatives. In 1959 he began his first of eight consecutive terms. In 1963 he rose to the position of majority leader and in May 1967, speaker, after Pete Cenarrusa resigned.

References

External links

William J. Lanting at Political Graveyard

1918 births
1998 deaths
Idaho Republicans
American people of Dutch descent
People from Twin Falls County, Idaho